CBDC may refer to:

 Central bank digital currency
 CBDC-FM, a radio station licensed to Mayo, Yukon, Canada
 Community business development corporation, a federal and provincially funded not-for-profit organization 
 Cardiff Bay Development Corporation